Magnolia tripetala, commonly called umbrella magnolia or simply umbrella-tree,  is a deciduous tree native to the eastern United States in the Appalachian Mountains, the Ozarks, and the Ouachita Mountains.  The name "umbrella tree" derives from the fact that the large leaves are clustered at the tips of the branches forming an umbrella-shaped structure.

Description
Umbrella magnolias have large shiny leaves 30–50 cm long, spreading from stout stems. In a natural setting the umbrella magnolia can grow 15 m tall. The flowers are large, appear in the spring, malodorous, 15–25 cm diameter, with six to nine creamy-white tepals and a large red style, which later develops into a red fruit (an aril) 10 cm long, containing several red seeds. These trees are attractive and easy to grow. The leaves turn yellow in the autumn. The leaves are clustered at the tip of the stem with very short internodes. The tree has reddish cone-shaped fruit, is shade tolerant, has shallow spreading roots, and is pollinated by beetles.

Notable trees
The largest known Magnolia tripetala is 15.2 m in height with a trunk diameter of 87 cm in Bucks County, Pennsylvania.

Gallery

References

External links
Magnolia tripetala images at the Arnold Arboretum of Harvard University Plant Image Database
Magnolia tripetala images at bioimages.vanderbilt.edu

tripetala
Trees of the Southeastern United States
Flora of the Appalachian Mountains
Plants described in 1759
Taxa named by Carl Linnaeus
Garden plants of North America
Ornamental trees